Parkin is a surname, and may refer to

 Arthur Parkin (born 1952), New Zealand field hockey player
 Ben Parkin (1906–1969), British Labour Party politician, MP for Stroud (1945–1950) and Paddington North (1953-69)
 Brian Parkin (born 1965), English footballer
 Cec Parkin (1886–1943), English cricketer
 David Parkin (born 1942), Australian Rules football player and coach
 Derek Parkin (born 1948), English footballer
 Dante Parkin (1873–1936), South African cricketer
 Edmond T. Parkin, Canadian architect
 Frank Parkin (born 1931), British sociologist
 George Parkin (1903–1971), English footballer
 George Robert Parkin, (1846–1922), Canadian educator and author
 Gerard Parkin, American chemist and metallurgist
 Ian Parkin (1950–1995), British musician (Be-Bop Deluxe)
 Jasmin Parkin, Canadian singer and keyboardist (Mother Mother)
 Jennifer Parkin, Canadian musician (Ayria)
 Joe Parkin, American professional cyclists and author
 John Parkin (infomercial presenter), British television presenter
 John B. Parkin (1911–1975), Canadian architect
 John C. Parkin (1922–1988), Canadian architect
 Jon Parkin (born 1981), English footballer
 Jonty Parkin (1894–1995), English rugby league player
 Lance Parkin, British author
 Leonard Parkin (1929–1993), British television and news presenter
 Molly Parkin (born 1932), Welsh artist and journalist
 Owen Parkin (born 1972), English cricketer
 Philip Parkin (born 1971), Welsh golfer and commentator
 Ray Parkin (1910–2005), Australian writer, artist and historian
 Ray Parkin (footballer) (1911–1971), English footballer
 Sam Parkin (born 1981), English footballer
 Sara Parkin, British Green Party politician and environmental campaigner
 Scott Parkin (born 1969), American environmental campaigner
 Sophie Parkin (born 1961), British author and actress
 Steve Parkin (born 1965), English footballer and manager
 Steve Parkin (musician), Australian musician
 Stuart Parkin, British experimental physicist
 Terence Parkin (born 1980), South African Olympic swimmer
 Tim Parkin (born 1957), English footballer and manager
 Tommy Parkin (born 1956), English footballer
 Tommy Parkin (footballer, born 1902) (1902–1984), English footballer
 William Parkin (1801-1889), South Australian businessman politician and philanthropist

See also
 Parkins
 Perkin (surname)
 Perkins

English-language surnames
Surnames from given names